

See also
Detailed Ottoman family tree

Bibliography

Bernard Lewis, The Emergence of Modern Turkey (Studies in Middle Eastern History), Publisher: Oxford University Press, USA; 3rd edition (September 6, 2001); Paperback: 568 pages; ;

External links

Bibliographies of Ottoman Sultâns, The Most Comprehensive Web Cite in Ottoman History: http://www.ottomanonline.net/index.html

 Website of the 700th Anniversary of the Ottoman Empire 
 Official website of the immediate living descendants of the Ottoman Dynasty 

 
Dynasty genealogy
Muslim family trees